Events in the year 1916 in Belgium.

Incumbents
Monarch: Albert I
Prime Minister: Charles de Broqueville

Events
 2–14 June – Battle of Mont Sorrel
 19 September – Belgian forces occupy Tabora in German East Africa (East African campaign)
 19 October – Cardinal Mercier protests the deportation of forced labourers to Germany.

Publications
 Désiré-Joseph Mercier, A Signal of Distress from the Belgian Bishops to Public Opinion (London, Eyre and Spottiswood)
 Felix Timmermans, Pallieter

Births
 21 January – Renaat Van Elslande, politician (died 2000)
 9 February – Gaston Van Roy, Olympic shooter (died 1989)
 7 March – Marie-Thérèse Bourquin, lawyer (died 2018)
 1 June – Jean Jérôme Hamer, cardinal (died 1996)
 16 April – Richard De Smet, Jesuit (died 1997)
 27 August – Robert Van Eenaeme, cyclist (died 1959)
 7 September – Charles Vanden Wouwer, footballer (died 1989)
 7 October – Léonce-Albert Van Peteghem, bishop of Ghent (died 2004)
 10 October – Bernard Heuvelmans, cryptozoologist (died 2001)
 18 October – Jacques Van Offelen, politician (died 2006)
 28 November – Mary Lilian Baels, second wife of King Leopold III of Belgium (died 2002) 
 30 November – Andrée de Jongh, patriot (died 2007)
 30 December – Robert-Joseph Mathen, bishop (died 1997)

Deaths
 4 January – Godefroid Kurth (born 1847), historian
 12 March – Julien Davignon (born 1854), Catholic politician
 1 April – Gabrielle Petit (born 1893), patriot
 16 May – Émile Royer (born 1866), politician
 1 June – François Stroobant (born 1819), lithographer
 11 July – Rik Wouters (born 1882), painter
 5 November – Antoon Stillemans (born 1832), bishop of Ghent 
 27 November – Émile Verhaeren (born 1855), poet

References

 
1910s in Belgium